Joel Carl Hunter (born April 18, 1948 in Shelby, Ohio) is the former senior pastor of Northland, A Church Distributed, a congregation of 20,000 that worshiped at three sites in Central Florida. He is the author of A New Kind of Conservative (Regal 2008), Church Distributed (Distributed Press 2008) and Inner State 80: Your Journey on the High Way (Higher Life 2009).   Hunter accepted the presidency of the Christian Coalition in 2006, but resigned before taking the office.

Hunter delivered the closing benediction on the final day of the 2008 Democratic National Convention, prayed with Senator Obama on the day of the 2008 presidential election and offered a blessing for President-elect Obama at the Pre-Inaugural Worship Service at St. John's Church on January 22, 2009. On February 5, 2009, he was appointed to the White House Office of Faith-Based and Neighborhood Partnerships. In April 2011, he was named a member of the Commission on Accountability and Policy for Religious Organizations. On October 2, 2020, Hunter officially endorsed Joe Biden for President of the United States. On December 13, 2022, he traveled to the White House to witness the signing of the Respect for Marriage Act.

Biography
Hunter was born April 18, 1948 in  Shelby, Ohio. His parents were Wilbur Hunter, a decorated World War II veteran, and Jean Hunter, a homemaker. When his father died in 1952, he spent much of his time with his maternal grandparents, Lena and Carl Bashore.  He graduated from Shelby High School in 1966.

He then attended Ohio University. While there, he became involved in the civil rights movement. In April 1968, after the assassination of Martin Luther King Jr., he had a crisis of faith and  felt called into ministry. He graduated from Ohio University with a Bachelor of Science degree in education.

He then attended Christian Theological Seminary in Indianapolis, Indiana in 1970, and received his Master of Divinity in 1973. After starting towards his Doctor of Ministry degree, he took his first church appointment as a youth minister at Bradley United Methodist Church in Greenfield, Indiana. There he met his wife, Becky. He stayed at Bradley for one year, and then became a minister at Southport United Methodist and remained there until obtaining his Doctor of Ministry degree in 1974. His thesis, in the field of culture and personality, was about equipping people for ministry. After graduation, he became pastor at  Mount Auburn United Methodist Church in Greenwood.

Married to Becky Gaylene Beeson in 1972, the Hunters raised three sons, have seven grandchildren and two great grandchildren.

Northland Church
In 1985, Hunter moved to Northland Community Church in Longwood, Florida. He stepped down in October, 2017.

Climate change activism
Hunter was asked in February 2006 to sign the Evangelical Climate Initiative, a document recognizing global warming based on the findings of the Nobel Prize-winning Intergovernmental Panel on Climate Change (IPCC). Fellow signatories included Rick Warren, the presidents of 39 Christian colleges, and the president of the Salvation Army.  In the spring of 2006, he was asked to host a TV advertisement by the group . In the summers of 2006 and 2008, Hunter was invited to symposiums on creation care at Windsor Castle. He has since been named by Grist Magazine as one of the top 15 religious leaders in creation care, along with Pope Benedict XVI and the Dalai Lama.

President's Advisory Council on Faith-Based and Neighborhood Partnerships
Hunter served in the inaugural year on the Advisory Council for the White House Office of Faith-Based and Neighborhood Partnerships (2009–2010), which advised President Barack Obama on substantive policy issues including interfaith relations, strengthening the role of fathers in society, and reducing the number of abortions.

References

External links
http://joelhunter.com

1948 births
Living people
People from Shelby, Ohio
People from Longwood, Florida
American United Methodist clergy
Ohio University alumni
Activists from Ohio